Solid Ground is the second studio album by American country music singer Rob Crosby. It was released on January 8, 1991 via Arista Nashville. The album includes the singles "Love Will Bring Her Around", "She's a Natural", "Still Burnin' for You", and "Working Woman".

Critical reception
Giving it a "C", Alanna Nash of Entertainment Weekly thought that the songs were mostly derivative of Lee Greenwood and The Desert Rose Band.

Track listing

Personnel
 Jeff Boggs - synclavier
 Rick Bowles - background vocals
 Dennis Burnside - piano
 Gary Burr - background vocals
 Carol Chase - background vocals
 Rob Crosby - acoustic guitar, lead vocals, background vocals
 Paul Franklin - bandora, pedabro
 Greg Jennings - electric guitar, hi-string guitar
 Scott Kinsey - bass guitar
 Mike Lawler - synthesizer
 Terry McMillan - percussion
 The Leonard Moon Singers - background vocals
 Jonell Mosser - background vocals
 Mike Severs - electric guitar, mandolin
 Pat Severs - steel guitar
 Harry Stinson - drums, background vocals
 Willie Weeks - bass guitar

Chart performance

Album

Singles

References

1990 debut albums
Arista Records albums
Rob Crosby albums
Albums produced by Scott Hendricks